Pablo Sexto Canton is a canton of Ecuador, located in the Morona-Santiago Province.  Its capital is the town of Pablo Sexto.  Its population at the 2001 census was 1,188.

References

Cantons of Morona-Santiago Province